Zabergan was the chieftain of the Kutrigur Bulgar Huns, a nomadic people of the Pontic–Caspian steppe, after Sinnion. His name is Iranian, meaning full moon. Either under pressure from incoming Avars, or in revolt against the Byzantine Empire, in the winter of 558, he led a large Kutrigur army that crossed the frozen Danube. The army was divided into three sections: one raided south far as Thermopylae, while two others the Thracian Chersonesus and the periphery of Constantinople. In March 559 Zabergan attacked Constantinople, and one part of his forces consisted of 7,000 horsemen, but Belisarius defeated him at the Battle of Melantias and he was forced to withdraw.

The transit of such big distances in a short period of time shows that the Kutrigurs were mounted warriors, and Zabergan's raiders were already encamped near the banks of the Danube. However, once again Emperor Justinian I (r. 527–565) managed to persuade the Utigur chieftain Sandilch to attack the Kutrigurs, which resulted in the decimation of both. Nevertheless, according to the 12th-century chronicle of Michael the Syrian the remnant of those Bulgars were granted Dacia in the time of Maurice (r. 582-602). It is unknown if he is related to the Byzantine general Zabergan, who in 586 defended the fortress Chlomaron against the Romans.

Honours
Zabergan Peak in Antarctica is named after Zabergan.

References

Sources
 
 
 
 

6th-century monarchs in Europe
Kutrigurs
6th-century deaths